George Rawlinson (23 November 1812 – 6 October 1902) was a British scholar, historian, and Christian theologian.

Life
Rawlinson was born at Chadlington, Oxfordshire, the son of Abram Tysack Rawlinson and the younger brother of the famous Assyriologist, Sir Henry Rawlinson. He was educated at Ealing School. Having taken a First in Literae Humaniores at the University of Oxford (from Trinity College) in 1838, he was elected to a fellowship at Exeter College, in 1840, where he was Fellow and tutor from 1842 to 1846. He was ordained in 1841, was curate at Merton, Oxfordshire, from 1846 to 1847, was Bampton Lecturer in 1859, and was Camden Professor of Ancient History from 1861 to 1889.

In his early days at Oxford, Rawlinson played cricket for the University, appearing in five matches between 1836 and 1839 which have since been considered to have been first-class.

He was elected as a member of the American Philosophical Society in 1869.

In 1872 he was appointed canon of Canterbury, and after 1888 he was rector of the rich City of London benefice All Hallows, Lombard Street. In 1873, he was appointed proctor in Convocation for the Chapter of Canterbury.

He married in 1846 Louisa Chermside, daughter of Sir Robert Alexander Chermside. They celebrated their golden wedding anniversary in 1896.

Canon Rawlinson died at his residence in Cathedral precincts, Canterbury, on 6 October 1902.

Publications
His chief publications are his translation of the History of Herodotus (in collaboration with Sir Henry Rawlinson and Sir John Gardner Wilkinson), 1858–60; The Five Great Monarchies of the Ancient Eastern World, 1862–67; The Sixth Great Oriental Monarchy (Parthian), 1873; The Seventh Great Oriental Monarchy (Sassanian), 1875; Manual of Ancient History, 1869; Historical Illustrations of the Old Testament, 1871; The Origin of Nations, 1877; History of Ancient Egypt, 1881; Egypt and Babylon, 1885; History of Phoenicia, 1889; Parthia, 1893; Memoir of Major-General Sir HC Rawlinson, 1898.

His lectures to an audience at Oxford University on the topic of the accuracy of the Bible in 1859 were published in later years as the apologetic work The Historical Evidences of the Truth of the Scripture Records Stated Anew.

He was also a contributor to the Speaker's Commentary, the Pulpit Commentary, Smith's Dictionary of the Bible, and various similar publications. He was the author of the article "Herodotus" in the 9th edition of the Encyclopædia Britannica.

References

Sources

External links

 
 
The History of Herodotus, translated by George Rawlinson.
Rawlinson, George. Historical Evidences of the Scripture Records Stated Anew: With Special Reference to the Doubts and Discoveries of Modern Times. New York: John B. Alden, 1885.

1812 births
1902 deaths
19th-century English historians
Greek–English translators
Alumni of Trinity College, Oxford
Fellows of Exeter College, Oxford
People from West Oxfordshire District
English cricketers
19th-century Anglicans
Oxford University cricketers
Canons of Canterbury
English cricketers of 1826 to 1863
Camden Professors of Ancient History
Presidents of the Oxford Union
Governors of Abingdon School
Historians of Phoenicia
Phoenician-Punic studies